Leslie George Reed (16 August 1932 – 25 May 2021) was an Australian rules footballer who played for Geelong in the VFL during the early 1950s.

Family
The son of Thomas William Reed (1907-1992), and Dorothy Jean Reed (1912-2006), née Mortimer, Leslie George Reed was born at Yea, Victoria on 16 August 1932.

He married Joan "Mickey" Heathcote (1931-2015) on 9 October 1954.

Football

Geelong (VFL)
Reed was a utility player and was recruited from Euroa.

He was the 19th man for the Geelong's 1951 premiership side that defeated the Essendon team that played without the suspended John Coleman, 11.15 (81) to 10.10 (70) -- he replaced the injured Loy Stewart during the match -- and he also played on the wing when Geelong lost to Collingwood, 8.17 (65) to 11.11 (77) in the 1953 Grand Final.

Notes

References
 ALL ELSE, The (Adelaide) News, (Friday, 5 October 1951), p.17.
 Euroa Football Club, The Alexandra Standard, (Friday, 5 March 1954), p.2.
 League Final Lists: Geelong, The Argus, (Monday, 12 April 1954), p.19.
 Holmesby, Russell and Main, Jim (2007). The Encyclopedia of AFL Footballers. 7th ed. Melbourne: Bas Publishing.

External links
 
 
 Euroa Football Club: Team of the Century, Euroa Football Netball Club, August 2001.

1932 births
2021 deaths
Australian rules footballers from Victoria (Australia)
Geelong Football Club players
Geelong Football Club Premiership players
Euroa Football Club players
People from Victoria (Australia)
One-time VFL/AFL Premiership players